Carlo Perrone may refer to:

 Carlo Perrone (footballer, born July 1960), former footballer and manager of Olhanense
 Carlo Perrone (footballer, born October 1960), former footballer and manager